The double colon may refer to:

 an analogy symbolism operator, in logic and mathematics
 a notation for equality of ratios
 a scope resolution operator, in computer programming languages

See also
 Colon (punctuation)